Ingrid Anna Kristina Vikman (born January 13, 1981) is an ice hockey forward from Sweden. She won a silver medal at the 2006 Winter Olympics and a bronze medal at the 2002 Winter Olympics.

References

External links

1981 births
Ice hockey players at the 2002 Winter Olympics
Ice hockey players at the 2006 Winter Olympics
Living people
Medalists at the 2002 Winter Olympics
Medalists at the 2006 Winter Olympics
Olympic bronze medalists for Sweden
Olympic ice hockey players of Sweden
Olympic medalists in ice hockey
Olympic silver medalists for Sweden
People from Överkalix Municipality
Swedish women's ice hockey centres
Sportspeople from Norrbotten County
21st-century Swedish women